Aito or AITO may refer to:

People
 Aito Mäkinen (1927–2017), Finnish film director, screenwriter, and producer
 Aíto García Reneses (born 1946), Spanish former professional basketball coach and player

Other uses
 Aitō, Shiga, Japan, a former town
 Aito, Tampere, Finland, a district
 Conus aito, a species of cone snail
 Association of Independent Tour Operators (AITO), a British travel industry trade group
 Aito M5 (Aito - Adding Intelligence To Auto), an automobile based on the Seres SF5 
 Aito M7, the second Huawei car, 6-seater 5-meter crossover, series hybrid, plug-in
 Association Internationale pour les Technologies Objets a non-profit computer science association